Brian D. Nieves is a former Republican member of the Missouri Senate, and a former majority whip in the Missouri House of Representatives.  Nieves represented the 26th District, which covers Franklin County, Warren County, and part of St.Louis County.

Personal life

Nieves is a graduate of Pacific High School in Franklin County.  In 1984, Nieves enlisted in the United States Navy, serving ten years as a Hospital Corpsman, as a field medic alongside the Marines.

Following his military service, Nieves returned to Franklin County.  He currently resides in Washington, Missouri with his wife, Julie.

Nieves was the host of a morning talk radio show called "The Patriot Enclave" on KWMO 1350 AM in Washington, MO and functioned as KWMO's marketing director. He and his wife also operate Nieves Enterprises and Hwy 66 Auto Sales. Additionally, Nieves serves as a high school substitute teacher.

Bullying Behavior

According to the Southern Poverty Law Center, Nieves is "something of a bully. In August 2010, after winning the Senate primary, he pulled a gun on a man who worked for his opponent’s campaign."
 
In April 2013 an article in Gawker covered an exchange of emails with one of his constituents. This was also reported in the Huffington post in the same month. In the exchange Nieves insulted the constituent's appearance and suggested that if he typed slower the constituent may find it easier to understand.

In August 2010 the Riverfront Times published a link to the 12 pages of a police report filed with the Washington Police department by Shawn Bell following an alleged verbal and physical attack by Nieves. In the report by Bell, he is said to have been hit with Nieves' spit in the face as well as kicked and punched while lying on the ground shirtless. He then forced Bell to call Nieves wife to apologize for letting her know that he had cheated on her, and to state it was not true. This was also reported in the Law and Order section of the Missouri State Dispatch.

In August 2010, Nieves was accused of assaulting an opponents' campaign worker, Shawn Bell, following a contentious primary election which Nieves won, during a visit by Bell to Nieves' campaign headquarters while he and his campaign manager were winding down the campaign. Nieves denied any assault had occurred and his campaign manager, who was present during the entire visit by Bell, concurred with this denial.  On September 10, 2010, Franklin County Prosecutor Bob Parks announced he would not be seeking criminal charges against Nieves, commenting that he could not prove that a criminal act had occurred. Shawn Bell announced in a statement that he still planned to file a civil lawsuit against Nieves.

Elected office
A new 98th District was created after redistricting following the 2000 census.  The 110th and 98th merged into the new (98th) District.  In 2002, Nieves ran to replace outgoing State Representatives May Scheve(D) and Francis Overschmidt(D).  Nieves won a primary race against Dave Bailey, and won a general election contest against Tom Herbst.  He won reelection in 2004, 2006, and 2008.  His term expired in 2010, at which point he ran to succeed John Griesheimer as a state senator. In 2014, Nieves ran an unsuccessful campaign for the position of Recorder of Deeds in Franklin County, Missouri, losing in the Republican primary. In January 2013, he was elected to Majority Whip of the Senate.

Electoral history

References

External links

Official Missouri State Senate profile

1965 births
Living people
United States Navy sailors
Republican Party members of the Missouri House of Representatives
Republican Party Missouri state senators
People from Washington, Missouri